The 2021/22 FIS Ski Jumping Continental Cup was the 31st in a row (29th official) Continental Cup winter season in ski jumping for men and the 18th for women. This was also the 20th summer continental cup season for men and 13th for women.

Other competitive circuits this season include the World Cup, Grand Prix, FIS Cup, FIS Race and Alpen Cup.

On 1 March 2022, following the 2022 Russian invasion of Ukraine, FIS decided to exclude athletes from Russia and Belarus from FIS competitions, with an immediate effect.

Map of Continental Cup hosts 
All 24 locations hosting Continental Cup events for men (6 summer / 14 winter), for women (3 summer / 8 winter) and shared (7) in this season.

 Men 
 Women 
 Shared

Men

Calendar

Summer

Winter

Standings

Summer

Winter

Women

Calendar

Summer

Winter

Standings

Summer

Winter

Notes

References 

FIS Ski Jumping Continental Cup
2021 in ski jumping
2022 in ski jumping